The 1988 United States presidential election in New Hampshire took place on November 8, 1988, as part of the 1988 United States presidential election, which was held throughout all 50 states and D.C. Voters chose four representatives, or electors to the Electoral College, who voted for president and vice president.

New Hampshire voted for the Republican nominee, Vice President George H. W. Bush, over the Democratic nominee, Massachusetts Governor Michael Dukakis, by a landslide margin of 26.16%. Bush took 62.49% of the vote to Dukakis's 36.33%.

Compared to the rest of liberal New England, New Hampshire historically had a strong fiscal conservative streak to its politics, and Bush's pledge not to raise taxes played well to the state's anti-tax electorate. This election would prove to be the GOP's high point in New Hampshire, as the state gave Bush his second-strongest win in the nation, behind only Utah.

In the following years, the state would drift to the left, though more on social issues than on economic issues. As the Republican Party moved to embrace the Christian right and became increasingly Southern, the GOP would suffer a rapid decline in its fortunes in New Hampshire. Despite the scale of Bush's victory in 1988, no Republican has since won even a majority of the state's votes, although his son George W. Bush would eke out a narrow 48–47 plurality in 2000.

, this is the last election in which a Republican has been able to win every county within the state as well as the last time the counties of Cheshire, Grafton, Merrimack and Strafford voted for a Republican presidential candidate. This is also the last time that New Hampshire was won by double digits by either party, (although Bill Clinton came incredibly close to doing so in 1996).

Results

Results by county

See also
 Presidency of George H. W. Bush
 United States presidential elections in New Hampshire

References

New Hampshire
1988
1988 New Hampshire elections